Simon Stagg is a fictional character appearing in American comic books published by DC Comics, serving primarily as an antagonist to the superhero Metamorpho in most comic book stories and their adaptations. He is responsible for turning Rex Mason into Metamorpho out of spite after catching him in a relationship with his daughter Sapphire Stagg.

The character has made several appearances in media outside of comics, such as the television series The Flash in which he was portrayed by William Sadler, and the DC Extended Universe film Wonder Woman 1984, in which he was portrayed by Oliver Cotton.

Publication history
Simon Stagg first appeared in The Brave and the Bold #57 and was created by Bob Haney and Ramona Fradon.

Mark Waid, writer of the Metamorpho limited series, commented that "writing Simon Stagg was always a tightrope walk. On the one hand, you don't want him to be so comically evil that he's a cartoon. On the other hand, you have to remember that he's an absolute creep. The key to Stagg is not losing sight of the fact that he does most everything he does for the sake of his daughter, regardless of how insane those actions may look to us".

Fictional character biography
Simon Stagg is the unscrupulous owner and CEO of Stagg Enterprises and the father of Sapphire Stagg. Adventurer Rex Mason wanted to win the hand of Sapphire Stagg. Simon sent Rex to Egypt to retrieve a meteor referred as the Orb of Ra. Unbeknownst to Rex, Simon had his brutish Neanderthal bodyguard Java attack him and leave him for dead. Rex was near the Orb of Ra and was exposed to it leading to his transformation into Metamorpho.

Sometime later, Simon Stagg tricked the Metal Men into attacking the Justice League and had Java detain Rocket Red #4 and Animal Man. It turned out that Rex had a baby, who harmed whatever it touched. Metamorpho handed the baby over to Simon, who became convinced he would now die, harmed like Java had been moments earlier. Simon came through unharmed since something in his genetic structure protected him just as it did with the baby's mother. Simon's stance softened, and everyone was allowed to go. Doc Magnus of the Metal Men offered his services to Simon in creating new arms for Java. On the way home, Metamorpho's friends were puzzled as to how he knew Simon would be unaffected by the child. Metamorpho indicates that he had hoped the baby would kill Simon.

Java came upon Black Canary while searching for help for Sapphire. His story was that Sapphire and Joey, Metamorpho's son, had been caught in a lab explosion and merged into a single energy being who was taking revenge upon Simon Stagg's former colleagues. It is revealed that not only were Sapphire and Joey merged, but so was Simon and it was him who was directing the revenge. Black Canary realized that Java was actually Metamorpho, somehow affected to believe he was Java (the actual Java's murder was still a secret known only to the Staggs). The three were separated once more with Simon claiming to have been overcome by the energy itself and unable to control his actions. As the comic ends, he steps away from the joyous family reunion to check on a growing clone of the murdered Java.

In the one-shot "Countdown to Infinite Crisis", Maxwell Lord is seen talking with Stagg on the phone.

In the "Blackest Night" tie-in Weird Western Tales #71 (Mar 2010), Stagg appeals to Joshua Turnbull (great-great-grandson of Quentin Turnbull) for help in analyzing a Black Lantern ring that was found on the grave of Don Hall and transported by The Ray. He leaves before the Lanterns attack, and it is unclear whether he survived the event.

During the "Brightest Day" storyline, Simon Stagg is later contacted at his Canadian estate by Metamorpho when he and his fellow Outsiders Black Lightning, Geo-Force, Katana, and Owlman (Roy Raymond, Jr.) need a place to stay during the War of the Supermen storyline after accidentally being shot down. Simon Stagg later placed Java's mind into the body of a Shaggy Man which was defeated by Freight Train.

In 2016, DC Comics implemented another relaunch of its books called "DC Rebirth" which restored its continuity to a form much as it was prior to "The New 52". Simon Stagg opened up the portal to the Dark Multiverse and was trying to use Metamorpho transmuted into Nth Metal in order to close it. This attracted the attention of Mister Terrific and Plastic Man. When Mister Terrific tries to get Simon Stagg to close the portal, Mister Terrific, Plastic Man, and Metamorpho are sucked in. Simon Stagg was present when Mister Terrific, Plastic Man, Metamorpho, and Phantom Girl made it back from the Multiverse. Due to the effects of the Dark Multiverse energy, Mister Terrific concludes that they can't go their separate ways due to this bond. Simon Stagg threatened to sue for invading his lab, though Mister Terrific made a compromise where they would continue investigating at Simon Stagg's mansion.

During the "Endless Winter" storyline, Simon Stagg is revealed to have a son named Sebastian.

In other media

Television
 Simon Stagg appears in Justice League, voiced by Earl Boen. In the two-part episode "Metamorphosis", Stagg Enterprises seeks to create a chemically altered individual who can survive in harsh environments known as "Metamorpho". Stagg has Java smuggle mutagen samples for the project into the country. Upon learning his favorite employee, Rex Mason, is in love with his daughter Sapphire, of whom Stagg was jealously protective, Stagg uses the chemicals on Mason, transforming him into a shape-shifting mutant, and tricks him into fighting the Green Lantern and the Justice League. Upon learning the truth however, Mason attacks Stagg. While he is driven off by the businessman's guards, Mason makes another attempt on his life, but this results in a freak accident that resulted in Stagg falling into a coma after his base desires end up in his chemicals and create a monstrous synthoid creature that goes on a rampage. When Mason destroys it, Stagg wakes up in the hospital screaming.
 Simon Stagg appears in Beware the Batman, voiced by Jeff Bennett. Following a minor appearance in the episode "Hunted", he returns in "Toxic", disapproving of his daughter, Sapphire's, relationship with Rex Mason and turning him into Metamorpho in an attempt to separate them. Upon Batman's arrival, Stagg flees and deletes the security footage, but Batman discovers the truth and tells Mason so he can be cured. Though Stagg grants Batman access, the antidote does not work. After Metamorpho vanishes, Stagg attempts to frame Batman, but the latter shows Sapphire footage depicting her father's role in turning Mason into Metamorpho. In "Monsters", Batman suspects Stagg of hiring and providing thugs with armor and weapons to drive people out of Old Gotham and buy the territory. He visits him in his cell at Blackgate Penitentiary, but Stagg denies being involved. The culprit is later revealed to be Sapphire, seeking to impress her father.
 Simon Stagg and Stagg Industries appear in series set in the Arrowverse:
 A Stagg Industries chemical plant appears in the Arrow episode "Burned", in which it is attacked by Firefly.
 Stagg himself appears in The Flash, portrayed by William Sadler. This version is a philanthropist, inventor, and an old acquaintance of Harrison Wells with more sinister underlying motivations. In the episode "Fastest Man Alive", Danton Black targets Stagg for stealing his research and taking credit for it, which led to the death of Black's wife, though the Flash saves the businessman. Stagg becomes fascinated by the speedster and begins planning to exploit him, but Eobard Thawne kills him to prevent Stagg from interfering in the former's plans. As of the episodes "Out of Time" and "Rogue Time", Stagg's murder remains undiscovered and he is reported missing, with rumors circulating that he became a recluse.
 Simon Stagg appears in the Young Justice: Outsiders episode "Triptych". He orchestrates a metahuman trafficking ring until he is eventually exposed and arrested. While in prison, he is visited by Shade.

Film
Simon Stagg appears in Wonder Woman 1984, portrayed by Oliver Cotton. This version is a business investor of Maxwell Lord's who demands to pull out after learning that the latter's oil business is fake and demeans him in front of his son, Alistair. Later, Lord absorbs the power of the Dreamstone and visits Stagg again to seemingly apologize for deceiving him while secretly tricking him into wishing that Lord's business will boom. After Lord leaves, the FBI arrive demanding to arrest Stagg for supposed tax fraud as a side effect of the Dreamstone.

Video games
 Stagg Industries' Gotham City HQ appears in DC Universe Online.
 Simon Stagg appears in Batman: Arkham Knight, voiced by Phil Proctor. This version is a philanthropist and entrepreneur from Central City who is researching airborne inoculation technology and has been accused of human rights violations. He also worked with the Scarecrow, who required Stagg's help on a project called "Cloudburst". Stagg develops Nimbus Generators, a clean power cell technology, for Scarecrow who later betrays Stagg. While working to uncover the Scarecrow's plot, Batman learns of Stagg's involvement from the Penguin and "borrows" a Nimbus Cell from Stagg to protect his equipment from the Cloudburst machine's nimbus field. Following this, Stagg is arrested by the GCPD.

Miscellaneous
Simon Stagg appears in a Dick Tracy comic strip published in February 2018. He strikes a deal with Ghost Pepper to buy his restaurant, Pepper's. However, Ghost backs out of the deal, poisons Stagg, and steals his money.

References

DC Comics supervillains
DC Comics television characters
Fictional businesspeople
Comics characters introduced in 1965
Characters created by Bob Haney